Story of Science may refer to:

The Story of Science: Power, Proof and Passion, 2010 BBC documentary
The Story of Science in America, 1967 science book by L. Sprague de Camp and Catherine Crook de Camp
The Story of Modern Science, 1923 book series by Henry Smith Williams

See also
List of popular misconceptions about science
List of science fiction short stories